The following article shows a list of caves in Italy.

Overview
Main concentration of Italian caves (singular: grotta) is close to the Alps and the Apennine Mountains, principally due to karst.

The main Italian tourist caves are Castellana and Frasassi. Other notable show caves are Pertosa, the Wind Cave, the Giant Cave, Castelcivita, Villanova, Toirano and Pastena.

Caves
The caves are listed by alphabetical order and there are shown the main tourist caves and other notable (e.g. archaeological or paleontological) underground voids.

Notes and references

See also
Grotto
List of caves

External links

Index of the show caves of Italy
 Photos of Italian caves on Flickr

 
Italy
Caves